Tifata is a mountain of Campania, Italy. The Abbey of Sant'Angelo in Formis is located on its western slopes.

In 83 BC as part of Sulla's civil war a battle was fought in the foothills of Mount Tifata.

References

Mountains of Campania